The billionaire space race is the rivalry among entrepreneurs who have entered the space industry from other industries - particularly computing. This private industry space race of the 21st century involves sending rockets to the ionosphere (mesosphere and thermosphere), orbital launch rockets, and suborbital tourist spaceflights. 

Today, the billionaire space race is primarily between three billionaires and their respective firms:
 Jeff Bezos's Blue Origin, which is seeking to establish an industrial base in space.
 Richard Branson's Virgin Group (through Virgin Galactic and Virgin Orbit), which seeks to dominate space tourism, low-cost small orbital launch vehicles, and intercontinental sub-orbital spaceflight.
 Elon Musk's SpaceX, which seeks to colonize Mars as well as provide satellite-based internet through its Starlink project.

Prior to his death in 2018, Paul Allen was also a major player in the billionaire space race through the aerospace division of his firm Vulcan. Allen sought to reduce the cost of launching payloads into orbit.

Background
The groundwork for the billionaire space race and private spaceflight was arguably laid by Peter Diamandis, an American entrepreneur. In the 1980s, he founded an American national student space society, the Students for the Exploration and Development of Space (SEDS). Later, Jeff Bezos became a chapter president of SEDS. In the 1990s, Diamandis, disappointed with the state of space development, decided to spur it on and spark the suborbital space tourism market, by initiating a prize, the X Prize. This led to Paul Allen becoming involved in the competition, creating the Scaled Composites Tier One platform of SpaceShipOne and White Knight One which won the Ansari X-Prize in the 2000s. The technology of the winning entrant was then licensed by Richard Branson's Virgin Group as a basis to found Virgin Galactic. The base techniques of Tier One also form the basis for Stratolaunch Systems (formerly of Vulcan Aerospace). The billionaire space race shows the aims of billionaires extend beyond just fulfilling government contracts, with their own gilding of the space age, in extending capabilities and their own luster. Elon Musk has expressed excitement for a new space race.

On July 11, 2021, Richard Branson and Virgin Galactic made a successful flight to space.

On July 20, 2021, Jeff Bezos and Blue Origin also made a successful flight to space.

In December 2021, a UK technology news platform, TechRound, released its list of the World's Top 10 Space Entrepreneurs. The results of a reader poll revealed that Sir Richard Branson beat his two closest rivals, Elon Musk and Jeff Bezos into second and third place respectively. Fellow space entrepreneurs Chris Newlands (4th) and Susmita Mohanty (5th) made up the top five.

Rivalries

SpaceX vs. Blue Origin
SpaceX and Blue Origin have had a long history of conflict. Blue Origin and SpaceX have had dueling press releases that compete with each other's announcements and events.

SpaceX and Blue Origin battled for the right to lease LC-39A, the rocket launch platform that was used to launch the Apollo moon missions. SpaceX won the lease in 2013, but Blue Origin filed suit in court against that. It is currently in the hands of SpaceX, while Blue Origin rented SLC-36 instead.

SpaceX filed suit against Blue Origin to invalidate their patent on landing rockets aboard ships at sea. They won their court fight in 2014. SpaceX had been attempting to land rockets at sea since 2014, finally succeeding in 2016, before Blue Origin ever even built a sea-going platform to land rockets onto.

SpaceX and Blue Origin got into a Twitter battle about the meaning of a used rocket, landed rocket, spacerocket, at the end of 2015, when New Shepard successfully landed, after a suborbital jaunt into space. SpaceX had previously launched and landed its Grasshopper rocket multiple times without reaching space. Then SpaceX landed a Falcon 9 first stage, which had been used to launch a satellite into orbit, prompting more Twitter battles at the start of 2016, such as Bezos tweeting "welcome to the club".

In late 2016, Blue Origin announced the New Glenn, directly competing against SpaceX's Falcon Heavy, with a larger rocket but lower payload.

At the 2016 International Astronautical Congress in Guadalajara, Mexico, Blue Origin President Rob Meyerson elaborated on the Bezos vision previously outlined in the New Glenn announcement. The Blue Origin New Armstrong would be similar in function to the SpaceX Interplanetary Transport System that Elon Musk unveiled at the same conference.

In April 2021, SpaceX beat Blue Origin to a 2.9 billion dollar contract to build the lunar lander for NASA's Artemis program.

Blue Origin vs. Virgin Galactic
Blue Origin and Virgin Galactic are in the same market, suborbital space tourism, with New Shepard and SpaceShipTwo, respectively. They are in a race to be first to launch paying customers on short spaceshots, with rival technological philosophies of space capsules and spaceplanes, respectively.

Former rivalries

Stratolaunch vs. Virgin Orbit
The Stratolaunch rivalries are no longer part of the billionaire space race, after 2019, having been suspended at the time of Paul Allen's death. The Stratolaunch company has since continued operations under new ownership, but does not focus on orbital space launches anymore.

Vulcan Aerospace subsidiary Stratolaunch Systems planned to air-launch satellite launcher rockets, the same profile as planned by Virgin Orbit for its LauncherOne operations. While LauncherOne was developed and launch aircraft procured (once White Knight Two, now 747 Cosmic Girl), the Scaled Composites "Roc" Model 351 is still being developed (as of 2022) and the rocket to mate to it (the company has refocused away from orbital spaceflight) has yet to be selected. After the death of Paul Allen in 2018, Stratolaunch was sold off, and no longer a billionaire insurgent venture.

See also
 Cold War Space Race; between the US and USSR; leading to the Race to the Moon

 Space launch market competition
 Commercialization of space
 Mars race
 List of billionaire spacetravellers

Further reading

References

Private spaceflight
Entrepreneurship
Business rivalries
Technological races
Billionaires